Tillamook Bay Community College (TBCC) is a public community college in Tillamook, Oregon. It was founded in 1981, after Clatsop Community College announced it would no longer offer classes in Tillamook County. The college offers classes at three locations: The Third Street Campus in Tillamook, which is its Primary location; North County Center located at Neah-Kah-Nie High School; and the South County Center in Pacific City, Oregon, on the Nestucca Valley High School Campus.

See also 
 List of Oregon community colleges

References

External links
 Official website

Tillamook, Oregon
Community colleges in Oregon
Educational institutions established in 1981
Buildings and structures in Tillamook County, Oregon
Education in Tillamook County, Oregon
1981 establishments in Oregon